Donahoe is a ghost town in Bell County, in the U.S. state of Texas. It is located within the Killeen-Temple-Fort Hood metropolitan area.

History
Donahoe was named for nearby Donahoe Creek, with both being named for a leading merchant who explored the area during the Texan Santa Fe Expedition in 1841. Settlers first settled along the creek in the late 1840s. Samuel Gibbs Leatherman opened a general store after he arrived in 1854 and Howel Bass was the local blacksmith six years later. A post office was established at Donahoe in 1888 and remained in operation until 1903. There was a general store, a blacksmith shop, and 60 residents in 1896. On the same site as Donahoe, another community named Dice (most likely named for John Dice) had a general store, a church, and several scattered homes in the mid-1800s. A Baptist church was located in the community in the 1950s. It was listed on a 1963 map and had several scattered dwellings. It was then abandoned in the late 1970s and had a cemetery. A Texas State Historical Marker was placed at the end of the decade.

Geography

Education
Science Hill School was built in the area in 1896 and had 79 students and one teacher in 1903. Another school named Dice School was located on the site in the mid-1800s. Today, Donahoe is located within the Bartlett Independent School District.

References

Ghost towns in Texas